ʿĀd is an ancient tribe mentioned frequently in the Qurʾān.

The tribe's members, referred to as ʿĀdites, formed a prosperous nation until they were destroyed in a violent storm. According to Islamic tradition, the storm came after they had rejected the teachings of a monotheistic prophet named Hud. ʿĀd is regarded as one of the original Arab tribes, the "lost Arabs".

Historicity, etymology, and location
In the second edition of the Encyclopaedia of Islam, F. Buhl commented that "whether there really existed, and where, a nation called ʿĀd, is still an unanswered question", though in the third edition, Andrew Rippin simply labelled them, less sceptically, "an ancient Arab tribe".

In religious stories, Hud and the tribe of ʿĀd have been linked to an eponymous, legendary king named ʽAd, but modern scholarship has discarded the idea of such a king. Speculation by nineteenth-century Western scholars included identifying the ʿĀd with the better known Iyād or with a tribe allegedly mentioned by Ptolemy, the Oadites, but such musings seem not to be given credence in the twenty-first century. It is even possible that the tribal name ʿĀd represents misinterpretation of a common noun: the expression min al-ʿād is today understood to mean "since the time of ʿĀd", but ʿād might originally have been a common noun meaning 'antiquity', which was reinterpreted as a proper noun, inspiring a myth of the tribe ʿĀd.

If the ʿĀd were a real tribe, the question arises of where they lived. The Qurʾān mentions their location was in al-ʾAḥqāf  ("the Sandy Plains," or "the Wind-curved Sand-hills") which is in modern day Yemen, often assumed to be in Southern Arabia. The Qurʾān also associates them with the phrase "Iram of the Pillars", so this is sometimes imagined to be a place where the ʿĀd lived — although it may have been the name of a region or a people. According to Andrew Rippin, "some modern speculation has associated Iram—and thus ʿĀd—with the buried city referred to as Ubar (Wabār), located at Shisur, Oman, because of the pillars found at that site."

Mentions in texts
The ʿĀd is mentioned in some Arabic poetry thought to be pre-Islamic, including the work attributed to Ṭarafa and in the Mufaḍḍaliyyāt, and in material recorded by Ibn Hishām; in this material they are understood as "an ancient nation that had perished".

The ʿĀd is mentioned twenty-four times in the Qurʾān. According to the Quran, the ʿĀd built monuments and strongholds at every high point and their fate is evident from the remains of their dwellings. There are other mentions of ʿĀd in the Qurʾān, namely Qurʾān 7, Q9:70, Qurʾān 11:50, 59–60, Q14:9, Q22:42, Q25:38, Qurʾān 26:123-140, Q38:12, 40:31, Qurʾān 41, Q50:13 Q51:41, Q53:50, Q54:18, Qurʾān 69, and Qurʾān 89:6.

In Andrew Rippin's summary,the tribe of ʿĀd is frequently mentioned alongside Thamūd and Noah, as in Q 9:70. A prosperous group living after the time of Noah (Q 7:69), the ʿĀd built great buildings (Q 26:128) associated with the aḥqāf (Q 46:21), understood as the "sand dunes" and identified by tradition as a place in the south of Arabia ... Hūd and other prophets were sent to the people of ʿĀd but they rejected him; they were then destroyed by a violent wind (Q 41:16, 46:24, 51:41, 54:19, 69:6) that lasted for a week and left only their buildings standing. The remnant of the tribe who survived, were the followers of Hūd (Q 7:72, 11:58).

Wahbah al-Zuhayli, Salih bin Abdullah al Humaid, Imam of Grand Mosque of Mecca, along with the officials of Ministry of Islamic Affairs, Dawah and Guidance also agreed the verse were speaking about the punishment from God towards ʿĀd peoples.

See also
 ʽAd, the supposed progenitor of the Adites
 Arabian Desert
 Madyan (Midian)
 People of al-Ukhdud ("the Ditch")
 People of Lut (Lot)
 People of Ya-Sin
 Sabaʾ (Sheba)
 Thamud
 Mahd al-Aadiyya

References

Tribes of Arabia
Articles about multiple people in the Quran
Giants in Islam
South Arabia
Iram of the Pillars